Labelle (pronounced: la-bell or often: LAY-bell) is a rural lakeside community in Queens County, Nova Scotia
. It is between Molega Lake and Ponhook Lake. The nearest towns are Bridgewater, Liverpool and Caledonia as well as the neighbouring village of Greenfield.

References
 Labelle on Destination Nova Scotia

Communities in the Region of Queens Municipality
General Service Areas in Nova Scotia